Amir Ashkenazi is an American-Israeli entrepreneur. He is the chief executive officer and founder of Switchboard and former CEO of Adap.tv, which was purchased by AOL for $405 million in 2013. Ashkenazi co-founded Adap.tv in 2007 and was CEO until 2014.

After the sale, the company became a division of AOL Platforms, of which Ashkenazi is president.  Before Adap.tv, he was co-founder and chief technology officer of Shopping.com, which was acquired by eBay for $620 million in 2005.

Education
Ashkenazi studied engineering and computer science at Tel-Aviv University.

References

American technology chief executives
Living people
Year of birth missing (living people)
Place of birth missing (living people)
Tel Aviv University alumni